Jesse Clements Jr. (March 7, 1927 – April 1, 1991) was an American football and basketball coach. He served as the head football coach at St. Augustine's College—now known as St. Augustine's University—in Raleigh, North Carolina from 1963 to 1965 and Shaw University in Raleigh from 
1973 to 1974. He was the interim co-head football coach with Robert Jackson at North Carolina Central University in Durham, North Carolina for part of the 1977 season. Clements was also the head basketball coach at St. Augustine's from 1958 to 1971 and North Carolina Central from 1979 to 1984.

A native of Champaign, Illinois, Clements attended St. Augustine's. Clements died on April 1, 1991, at Rex Hospital in Raleigh.

Head coaching record

Football

Notes

References

External links
 

1927 births
1991 deaths
American football ends
North Carolina Central Eagles football coaches
North Carolina Central Eagles men's basketball coaches
Shaw Bears football coaches
St. Augustine's Falcons athletic directors
St. Augustine's Falcons football coaches
St. Augustine's Falcons men's basketball coaches
St. Augustine's Falcons men's basketball players
College men's basketball head coaches in the United States
African-American coaches of American football
African-American players of American football
African-American basketball coaches
African-American basketball players
African-American college athletic directors in the United States
Sportspeople from Champaign, Illinois
20th-century African-American sportspeople